The 2013–14 FA Cup qualifying rounds opened the 133rd season of competition in England for 'The Football Association Challenge Cup' (FA Cup), the world's oldest association football single knockout competition. A total of 737 clubs were accepted for the competition, down 21 from the previous season's 758.

The large number of clubs entering the tournament from lower down (Levels 5 through 10) in the English football pyramid meant that the competition started with six rounds of preliminary (2) and qualifying (4) knockouts for these non-League teams. The 32 winning clubs from Fourth qualifying round progressed to the First round proper, where League teams tiered at Levels 3 and 4 entered the competition.

For the first time ever in the history of the FA Cup, a club from Guernsey entered the competition, Guernsey F.C. This Level 8 club, from the Isthmian League, entered the competition in the preliminary round.

Calendar and prizes
The calendar for the 2013–14 FA Cup qualifying rounds, as announced by The Football Association.

Extra preliminary round
Extra preliminary round fixtures were played on the weekend of 17 August 2013, with replays taking place on 20–22 August. 370 teams, from Level 9 and Level 10 of English football, entered at this stage of the competition. The round featured 89 teams from Level 10, being the lowest ranked teams in this round.

Preliminary round
Preliminary round fixtures were played on the weekend of 31 August 2013. A total of 320 teams took part in this stage of the competition, including the 185 winners from the Extra preliminary round and 135 entering at this stage from the six leagues at Level 8 of English football, while Darlington 1883 from Northern Premier League were ineligible to participate as they only spent their second season. The round featured 34 teams from Level 10 still in the competition, being the lowest ranked teams in this round.

First qualifying round
The First qualifying round fixtures were played on the weekend of 14 September 2013, with replays being played the following mid-week. A total of 232 teams took part in this stage of the competition, including the 160 winners from the Preliminary round and 72 entering at this stage from the top division of the three leagues at Level 7 of English football. The round featured 10 teams from Level 10 still in the competition, being the lowest ranked teams in this round.

Second qualifying round
The Second qualifying round fixtures were played on the weekend of 28 September 2013. A total of 160 teams took part in this stage of the competition, including the 116 winners from the First qualifying round and 44 Level 6 teams, from Conference North and Conference South, entering at this stage. The round featured Atherstone Town, Blaby & Whetstone Athletic and Jarrow Roofing BCA from Level 10 still in the competition, being the lowest ranked teams in this round.

Third qualifying round
The Third qualifying round took place on the weekend of 12 October 2013. A total of 80 teams took part, all having progressed from the second qualifying round. Atherstone Town, from Level 10 of English football, was the lowest-ranked team to qualify for this round of the competition.

Fourth qualifying round
The Fourth qualifying round took place on the weekend of 26 October 2013. A total of 64 teams took part, 40 having progressed from the third qualifying round and 24 teams from Conference Premier, forming Level 5 of English football, entering at this stage. The lowest-ranked sides to qualify for this round were Level 9 teams Brislington, Marske United and Hartley Wintney.

Competition proper

Winners from Fourth qualifying round advance to first round Proper, where teams from Level 3 and Level 4 of English football, operating in The Football League, first enter the competition. See 2013-14 FA Cup for a report of First round proper onwards.

References

External links
 The FA Cup Archive

2013–14 FA Cup
FA Cup qualifying rounds